Vicente Luis Lapatza Tineo (born 5 August 1927) is a Spanish former footballer who played as a goalkeeper.

Career
Born in Erandio, Lapatza began playing football with local side SD Indautxu, playing in the Tercera División during the 1946–47 season. He joined home-town SD Erandio Club during the 1949–50 Segunda División season, before moving to Colombia to play for Universidad Bogotá and Atlético Junior from 1951 to 1953. In 1953, he returned to Spain and played one season in La Liga with Sporting de Gijón.

References

1927 births
Possibly living people
Spanish footballers
Footballers from the Basque Country (autonomous community)
Atlético Junior footballers
Sporting de Gijón players
SD Indautxu footballers
Association football goalkeepers
SD Erandio Club players